The city of Tampa, Florida is officially divided into six geographical regions:  New Tampa, West Tampa, Brooklyn Village, Downtown Tampa, Ybor City, and  Channel District each coinciding with a respective Tampa City Council district. The neighborhoods are managed by Neighborhood and Community Relations, a department under Neighborhood Services,  a city department which serves as a resource for residents and businesses.
 
The following are a list of major neighborhoods in the city of Tampa, Florida, United States, organized by broad geographical location within the city.

Neighborhoods and districts
There are six historic districts and around 84 officially named neighborhoods of Tampa along with other subdistricts not reported separately by the city.

Historic districts

Hampton Terrace Historic District
Hyde Park
Seminole Heights
Tampa Heights
West Tampa
Ybor City

Residential neighborhoods

Armenia Gardens Estates
Audubon Park
Ballast Point
Bayshore Beautiful
Bayshore Gardens
Bayside West
Beach Park
Beach Park Isles
Beasley
Bel Mar Shores
Bon Air
Carver City-Lincoln Gardens
Channel District
College Hill
Culbreath Bayou
Culbreath Heights
Culbreath Isles
Davis Islands
Dixie Farms
Drew Park
Eastern Heights
East Tampa
Belmont Heights
Jackson HeightsRainbow Heights
East Ybor
Fair Oaks - Manhattan Manor
Fern Cliff
Florence Villa
Forest Hills
Gandy-Sun Bay South
Golf View
Grant Park
Gray Gables
Harvey Heights
Highland Pines
Historic Hyde Park North
Hyde Park Spanishtown Creek
Harbour Island
Hunter's Green
Interbay
Live Oaks Square
Lowry Park
Lowry Park North
Maryland Manor
New Suburb Beautiful
North Bon Air
Northeast Community
North Hyde Park
North Tampa
Northview Hills
Oakford Park
Oak Park
Old Seminole Heights
Palma Ceia
Palma Ceia Pines
Palma Ceia West
Palmetto Beach
Parkland Estates
Port Tampa
Rattlesnake
Rembrandt Gardens
Ridgewood Park
River Arts District
Riverbend
Rivercrest
River Grove
Riverside Heights
Robles Park
Soho District
South Seminole Heights
Southeast Seminole Heights
Southern Pines
South Nebraska
South Westshore
Sulphur Springs
Sunset Park
Swann Estates
Tampa Overlook
Tampa Palms
Temple Crest
Terrace Park
University Square
V.M. Ybor
Virginia Park
Wellswood
West Hyde Park
West Meadows
West Tampa
Bowman Heights
MacFarlane Park
Marina Club
Northeast Macfarlane
Old West Tampa
Water Street, Tampa
West Riverfront
Westshore Palms
Woodland Terrace

Central business districts
Downtown Tampa
Uptown Tampa, a subdistrict in the northwestern section of Downtown Tampa.
Westshore Business District

Other divisions and designations
There have been a number of divisions of Tampa, some of which are still used in common local conversation, but which do not correspond with Neighborhood and Community Relations designations.

Industrial areas

Garrison Channel
Gary
Uceta Yard

Other areas
Rocky Point
Soho District, a subdistrict within Hyde Park

References

External links

 City of Tampa neighborhood map
Neighborhood Registry
Tampa Neighborhood Information 

 
Tampa
Neighborhoods